UMPS CARE is a 501(c)(3) nonprofit organization formed in 2006 by Major League Baseball (MLB) umpires to provide comfort, encouragement, and support to seriously ill children in hospitals and their families. Umpire crews visit hospitals and distribute gifts to children during the baseball season as well as the off-season, The charity's motto is "Helping People is an Easy Call". As of 2017, the umpires have visited 131 hospitals for UMPS CARE events. The effort originated with umpires Marvin Hudson and Mike DiMuro, who began the "Blue For Kids" hospital visitation program in 2004.

In recent years, UMPS CARE has expanded to include college scholarships for older adopted children and the participation of minor league umpires.

Programs offered

UMPS CARE says its outreach "has given faces and personalities to the men we used to see as stern, cold officiators". Umpire Tripp Gibson, for example, has participated in bowling and golf tournaments, as well as visiting injured soldiers at Walter Reed Medical Center.

The umpires' efforts include "BLUE For Kids", "Blue Crew Tickets", and "All-Star Scholarships".

BLUE for Kids

The "BLUE for Kids" program features Major League umpire crews making bedside visits to seriously ill children in hospitals. Umpires Marvin Hudson and Mike DiMuro initiated the "Blue For Kids" hospital visitation program in 2004, which became part of UMPS CARE in 2006.

Each child receives a Build-A-Bear Workshop teddy bear or other stuffed animal, along with words of encouragement. Sometimes, the home team mascot accompanies the umpires for added fun. In 2017, for example, MASN televised an umpire crew of James Hoye, Jeff Kellogg, and Will Little visiting patients at Johns Hopkins Hospital in Baltimore, Maryland, accompanied by the Baltimore Orioles Bird mascot. In covering the event, MASN reported:  

On ESPN's Wednesday Night Baseball show, host  Jon Sciambi showed umpires  Mike Winters, Mark Wegner, Marty Foster, and Mike Muchlinski at a St. Louis, Missouri, children's hospital for a "BLUE For Kids" event. As of 2017, umpires have held events at 131 hospitals, distributing more than 12,500 Build-A-Bear stuffed animals since 2006.

Blue Crew tickets
The charity also helps bring youngsters to Major League Baseball games they might not otherwise get to see. With the support of the UMPS CARE charity, umpire Tom Hallion and his crew hosted children at Citizens Bank Park for a Philadelphia Phillies game. The "Blue Crew Tickets" program offers ballgame tickets to underprivileged youth and on-field presentation of souvenirs. More than 6,000 children have been recipients of the outreach, as of 2018. Tickets are made available through such partners as Big Brothers Big Sisters of America.

All-Star Scholarships
The umpires annually award a college scholarship to a high school senior who was adopted over the age of ten and who might otherwise not be able to afford tuition. A total of $30,000 in scholarships was provided in 2018.

Fund raising

The 501(c)(3) organization conducts online auctions and golf tournaments to help underwrite its programs. At the 2009 All-Star Game, then U.S. President Barack Obama autographed baseballs for a charity auction held by UMPS CARE to benefit hospitalized children. 

In 2018, UMPS CARE participation was expanded to include Minor League Baseball umpires. Umpires also now reach out to military families attending baseball games.

References

Charities based in Maryland
Children's charities based in the United States
Baseball organizations
501(c)(3) organizations
2006 establishments in Maryland
Youth organizations established in 2006
Sports organizations established in 2006